National Highway 539 (NH 539) is a  National Highway in India (Bharat).

References

National highways in India